"Political hack", also called partisan hack, is a pejorative term describing a person who is more supporting to a particular party than what is ethically right. The term "hired gun" is often used in tandem to further describe the moral bankruptcy of the "hack". When a group of "political hacks" of a similar political affiliation get together, they are sometimes called a "political hack pack."  When one side of a debate has more "political hacks" than the other, this is referred to as a "hack gap" and gives an advantage to the side with more "political hacks."

See also
Political machine

References

Political slurs for people